The following lists events that happened during 2000 in the Democratic Republic of the Congo.

Incumbents 
 President: Laurent-Désiré Kabila

Events

References

Sources

 
2000s in the Democratic Republic of the Congo
Years of the 20th century in the Democratic Republic of the Congo
Democratic Republic of the Congo
Democratic Republic of the Congo